José María Alonso (born 31 January 1915, date of death unknown) was a Spanish sailor. He competed in the Star event at the 1948 Summer Olympics.

References

External links
 

1915 births
Year of death missing
Spanish male sailors (sport)
Olympic sailors of Spain
Sailors at the 1948 Summer Olympics – Star
Sportspeople from Bilbao
Sailors (sport) from the Basque Country (autonomous community)